Points system may refer to:

 Point system (driving), where penalty or demerit points are accrued for traffic offences
 List of motorsports points scoring systems
 List of American Championship car racing point scoring systems
 List of FIM World Championship points scoring systems
 List of Formula One World Championship points scoring systems
 List of NASCAR points scoring systems
 Group tournament ranking system with points for matches won, goals scored, etc.
 Central Applications Office, points system for Leaving Certificate students applying to enter third-level education in Ireland
 Points system (cricket)

See also
 Point (disambiguation)